The Pomp and Circumstance Marches (full title Pomp and Circumstance Military Marches), Op. 39, are a series of five (or six) marches for orchestra composed by Sir Edward Elgar. The first four were published between 1901 and 1907, when Elgar was in his forties; the fifth was published in 1930, a few years before his death; and a sixth, compiled posthumously from sketches, was published in 1956 and in 2005–2006. They include some of Elgar's best-known compositions.

Title
The title is taken from Act III, Scene 3 of Shakespeare's Othello:

Farewell the neighing steed and the shrill trump,
The spirit-stirring drum, th'ear-piercing fife,
The royal banner, and all quality,
Pride, pomp, and circumstance of glorious war!

But also, on the score of the first march, Elgar set as a motto for the whole set of marches a verse from Lord de Tabley's poem "The March of Glory", which (as quoted by Elgar's biographer Basil Maine) begins

Like a proud music that draws men on to die
Madly upon the spears in martial ecstasy,
A measure that sets heaven in all their veins
   And iron in their hands.
I hear the Nation march
Beneath her ensign as an eagle's wing;
O'er shield and sheeted targe
The banners of my faith most gaily swing;
Moving to victory with solemn noise,
With worship and with conquest, and the voice of myriads.

proclaiming the "shows of things" (Maine's quotation marks): the naïve assumption that the splendid show of military pageantry—"Pomp"—has no connection with the drabness and terror—"Circumstance"—of actual warfare. The first four marches were all written before the events of World War I shattered that belief, and the styles in which wars were written about spurned the false romance of the battle-song.

Marches

The Pomp and Circumstance marches are
March No. 1 in D (1901)
March No. 2 in A minor (1901)
March No. 3 in C minor (1904)
March No. 4 in G (1907)
March No. 5 in C (1930)
March No. 6 in G minor (written as sketches, elaborated by Anthony Payne in 2005–06)

The first five were all published by Boosey & Co. as Elgar's Op. 39, and each of the marches is dedicated to a particular musical friend of Elgar's.

Each march takes about five minutes to play.

March No. 1 in D

Dedication
March No. 1, was composed in 1901 and dedicated "to my friend Alfred E. Rodewald and the members of the Liverpool Orchestral Society".

Instrumentation
The instrumentation is: two piccolos (2nd ad lib.), two flutes, two oboes, two clarinets in A, bass clarinet in A, two bassoons, contrabassoon, four horns in F, two trumpets in F, two cornets in A, three trombones, tuba, three timpani, percussion (bass drum, cymbals, triangle, side drum, jingles, glockenspiel (ad. lib.) and tambourine (ad lib.)), two harps, organ, and strings.

History
The best known of the six marches, Pomp And Circumstance March No. 1 In D had its premiere, along with March No. 2, in Liverpool on 19 October 1901, with Alfred Rodewald conducting the Liverpool Orchestral Society. Elgar and his wife attended, and it was a "frantic" success. Both marches were played two days later at a London Promenade Concert (which the Elgars unintentionally missed) in the Queen's Hall London, conducted by Henry Wood, with March No. 1 played second. Wood remembered that the audience "...rose and yelled... the one and only time in the history of the Promenade concerts that an orchestral item was accorded a double encore."

The Trio contains the tune known as "Land of Hope and Glory". In 1902 the tune was re-used, in modified form, for the "Land of hope and glory" section of his Coronation Ode for King Edward VII. The words were further modified to fit the original tune, and the result has since become a fixture at the Last Night of the Proms, and an English sporting anthem and general patriotic song.

In Canada, the Philippines and the United States, the Trio section "Land of Hope and Glory" of March No. 1 is often known simply as "Pomp and Circumstance" or as "The Graduation March" and is played as the processional tune at virtually all high school and most college graduation ceremonies. It was first played at such a ceremony on 28 June 1905, at Yale University, where the Professor of Music Samuel Sanford had invited his friend Elgar to attend commencement and receive an honorary doctorate of music. Elgar accepted, and Sanford made certain he was the star of the proceedings, engaging the New Haven Symphony Orchestra, the College Choir, the Glee Club, the music faculty members, and New York musicians to perform two parts from Elgar's oratorio The Light of Life and, as the graduates and officials marched out, "Pomp and Circumstance" March No. 1. Elgar repaid the compliment by dedicating his Introduction and Allegro to Sanford later that year.

Description
March No. 1 opens with an introduction marked Allegro, con molto fuoco. The introduction leads to a new theme: strong pairs of beats alternating with short notes, and a bass which persistently clashes with the tune. The bass tuba and full brass is held back until the section is repeated by the full orchestra. A little rhythmic pattern is played by the strings, then repeated high and low in the orchestra before the section is concluded by a chromatic upward scale from the woodwind. The whole of this lively march section is repeated. The bridging section between this and the well-known Trio has rhythmic chords from the brass punctuating high held notes from the wind and strings, before a fanfare from trumpets and trombones leads into the theme with which the march started. There are a few single notes that quieten, ending with a single quiet tap from side drum and cymbal accompanied by all the bassoons. The famous, lyrical "Land of Hope and Glory" trio follows (in the subdominant key of G), played softly (by the first violins, four horns and two clarinets) and repeated by the full orchestra including two harps. What follows is a repetition of what has been heard before, including a fuller statement of the Trio (this time in the 'home' key of D) in which the orchestra is joined by organ as well as the two harps. The march ends, not with the big tune, but with a short section containing a brief reminder of the brisk opening march.

March No. 2 in A minor

Dedication
March No. 2 was composed in 1901 and dedicated "To my friend Granville Bantock".

Instrumentation
The instrumentation is: piccolo, 2 flutes, 2 oboes, 2 clarinets in A, bass clarinet in A, 2 bassoons, contrabassoon, 4 horns in F, 2 trumpets in F, 2 cornets in A, 3 trombones, tuba, timpani (3), percussion (2 side drums, triangle, glockenspiel & jingles, bass drum & cymbals), and strings.

History
It was first performed, as was March No. 1, by the Liverpool Orchestral Society conducted by Alfred Rodewald, in Liverpool on 19 October 1901. Both marches were played two days later at a London Promenade Concert.

Description
The second is the shortest and most simply constructed of the marches. The composer Charles Villiers Stanford is said to have preferred this march to the first, and thought this the finest of all the marches. After a loud call to attention from the brass, a simple staccato theme, tense and repetitive, is played quietly by the strings, being gradually joined by other instruments before building up to an abrupt climax. This section is repeated. The second theme, confidently played by horns and clarinets, with contrasting triple and duple rhythms, is one which was sketched by Elgar a few years before: this is developed and ends with flourishes from the strings and brass joined by the glockenspiel. The opening staccato theme returns, concluded by a quiet swirling bass passage, which leads into the Trio section (in the tonic major key of A) which consists of a delightfully simple tune in thirds played by the woodwind (flutes, oboes, clarinets and bassoons), answered conclusively by the strings and brass. This Trio section is repeated, and the march concluded with a brilliant little coda, which includes a drum roll on the snare drum, a shattering chord in A Minor, briefly played by horns, and followed by a final cadence.

March No. 3 in C minor

Dedication
March No. 3 was completed in November 1904 and published in 1905. It was dedicated "To my friend Ivor Atkins". It was first performed on 8 March 1905, in the Queen's Hall, London, conducted by the composer.

Instrumentation
The instrumentation is: piccolo, 2 flutes, 2 oboes, cor anglais, 2 clarinets in B, bass clarinet in B, 3 bassoons, contrabassoon, 4 horns in F, 2 trumpets in B, 2 cornets in B, 3 trombones, tuba, timpani (3), percussion (tenor drum, side drum, bass drum & cymbals), and strings.

Description
March No. 3 differs from the others in its opening mood, which is deliberately solemn. It begins with a dark subdued quick march led by low clarinets, three bassoons and the horns (with drum-beats inserted between the notes of the tune), before a vigorous theme (with brass alone at the first beats), erupts from the full orchestra. The dark theme re-appears, is then restarted boldly, then ended abruptly. The central section commences with a perky tune played by a solo clarinet with simple string accompaniment, which is followed by another of Elgar's noble tunes played by the strings of the orchestra. All the themes re-appear and there is the final section which ends abruptly.

March No. 4 in G 
March No. 4 is as upbeat and ceremonial as No. 1, containing another big tune in the central Trio section.

Dedication
March No. 4 was completed on 7 June 1907, and dedicated "To my friend Dr. G. Robertson Sinclair, Hereford". It was first performed on 24 August 1907, in the Queen's Hall, London, conducted by the composer.

Instrumentation
The instrumentation is: piccolo (with 3rd flute), 2 flutes, 2 oboes, cor anglais, 2 clarinets in B, bass clarinet in B, 2 bassoons, contrabassoon, 4 horns in F, 3 trumpets in A, 3 trombones, tuba, timpani (3), percussion (side drum, bass drum & cymbals), 2 harps, and strings.

History
The Trio was used by Elgar in a song called "The King's Way" which he wrote, to his wife's words, in celebration of the opening of an important new London street called Kingsway in 1909.

In World War II, No. 4 also acquired words: a patriotic poem by A. P. Herbert with the refrain beginning "All men must be free" was used as "Song of Liberty".

In the wedding of Charles, Prince of Wales, and Lady Diana Spencer, Pomp and Circumstance No. 4 served as the recessional. As Diana's veil was lifted and the couple bowed and curtsied to Queen Elizabeth II, the opening notes sounded and continued as they walked down the aisle of St Paul's Cathedral out to the portico and the waiting crowds.

Description
The march has an opening section consisting mainly of two-bar rhythmic phrases which are repeated in various forms, and a lyrical Trio constructed like the famous "Land of Hope and Glory" trio of March No. 1.

The first eight bars of the march is played by the full orchestra with the melody played by the violas and upper woodwind. Both harps play from the beginning, while the cellos, double basses and timpani contribute a simple bass figure. The bass clarinet, contrabassoon, trombones and tuba are held "in reserve" for the repeat, when the first violins join the violas with the tune. There are subdued fanfares from the brass interrupted by little flourishes from the strings before the opening march is repeated. There is pause, then a little section which starts forcefully but quietens, leading into the Trio. The Trio follows the pattern of March No. 1, with the melody (in the subdominant key of C) played by clarinet, horn and violins. The violins start the Trio tune on the lowest note they can play, an "open" G-string, which gives a recognisable "twang" to this one note, and they are directed to play the passage "sul G" on the same string, for the sake of the tone-colour, and the accompaniment is from the harps, low strings and bassoons. The grand tune is repeated, as we expect, by the full orchestra; the opening march section returns; the grand tune is repeated once more, in the "home" key of G major; and the last word is had by a re-statement of the opening rhythmic patterns. The march prepares the audience for its end as surely as a train pulling into a station, with the violins, violas, and cellos ending on their resonant "open" G.

March No. 5 in C

Dedication
March No. 5 was composed in 1930, much later than the others, and dedicated "To my friend Dr. Percy C. Hull, Hereford". Its first public performance was on 20 September 1930 in a Queen's Hall concert conducted by Sir Henry Wood, though it had been recorded two days earlier in the Kingsway Hall, London, conducted by Elgar himself in spite of his poor health.

Instrumentation
The instrumentation is: piccolo, 2 flutes, 2 oboes, cor anglais, 2 clarinets in B, bass clarinet in B, 2 bassoons, contrabassoon, 4 horns in F, 3 trumpets in B, 3 trombones, tuba, timpani (3), percussion (side drum, bass drum & cymbals), and strings.

Description
Without introduction, its opening episode is extended with enormous confidence and proceeds directly into the Trio section. The Trio starts quietly in a similar way to the introduction of his First Symphony: just a moving bass line and a tune, also in the same key (A). The tune is re-stated strongly, as we expect, then developed. The re-statement of the opening employs the same instruments of the orchestra, but is this time started as soft as possible for just four bars before a quick crescendo restores its spirit to as it was in the beginning. There is more development before a big return of the Trio theme, in the home key of C, and a triumphant ending which might bring to mind the conclusion of Grieg's In the Hall of the Mountain King.

March No. 6 in G minor

History
Elgar left sketches for a sixth Pomp and Circumstance march, to be the final work in the set.

Version orchestrated by Percy M. Young
In 1956, Boosey & Co. published a Military March No. 6 in the key of B major, arranged and orchestrated by Percy M. Young. According to the introduction Young indicates that certain manuscripts were made available to him from the estate of the Grafton family (of Elgar's niece May Grafton), including a short score dated March 1924 and separate violin and cello parts. Elgar indicated details of orchestration and expression. From these sources Young orchestrated 117 bars for full orchestra including harp (but not organ). However it appears to be substantially The Empire March composed for the British Empire Exhibition of 1924, including the Trio section A Song of Union.

Version completed by Anthony Payne
In 2005, Elgar's sketches were sent by the lawyer for the Elgar Will Trust in a bundle to the English composer Anthony Payne. Also included was an article titled "Circumstantial Evidence" by the Elgar authority Christopher Kent from the August 1997 Musical Times explaining the sketches. One idea in the sketches was marked by the composer "jolly good". Kent believed that Elgar's compositional thoughts and time were by then engaged with the Third Symphony and The Spanish Lady, and that the main theme for the march was "unpromising". Payne felt there was not enough in the sketches to complete the march, but three pages of score in Elgar's handwriting were discovered at the Royal School of Church Music Colles Library marked "P&C 6". In 2006, the score and sketches were turned into a performing version. Payne observed in the programme notes that "Nowhere else in the Pomp and Circumstance marches does Elgar combine compound and duple metres in this way". Payne concluded the piece with a brief allusion to the first Pomp and Circumstance March. The world premiere of Payne's version was on 2 August 2006 with Andrew Davis conducting the BBC Symphony Orchestra at The Proms at Royal Albert Hall. The first recording was by the BBC National Orchestra of Wales under Richard Hickox.

Instrumentation
The instrumentation is: piccolo, 2 flutes, 2 oboes, cor anglais, 2 clarinets in B, bass clarinet in B, 2 bassoons, contrabassoon, 4 horns in F, 3 trumpets in B, 3 trombones, tuba, timpani (4), percussion (side drum, cymbals, bass drum, jingles, glockenspiel), and strings.

Arrangements

For piano solo: The first four marches were arranged by Adolf Schmid and March No. 5 by Victor Hely-Hutchinson.

For piano duo: March No. 1 was arranged by Adolf Schmid.

For organ: March No. 1 was arranged by Edwin H. Lemare and March No. 4 was arranged by G. R. Sinclair. Marches 1–5 have been arranged in simplified and abbreviated form by William McVicker; concert transcriptions of Marches 2, 3, and 5, matching the Lemare and Sinclair arrangements, have been made by Michael Brough for use at Holy Trinity Sloane Street but have not yet been published.

For military band: The first four marches were arranged by M. Retford and March No. 5 by T. Conway Brown.

For brass band: March No. 1 was arranged (transposed to B) by J. Ord Hume.

An arrangement featuring melodies from Marches 1 through 4 was used in Disney's Fantasia 2000 to accompany a retelling of the story of Noah's Ark featuring Donald and Daisy Duck.

Recordings
 The first recording with Elgar conducting (Marches 1 and 4 only) was weeks before the outbreak of World War I, in July 1914. This acoustic recording was made for the Gramophone Company and appeared under the H.M.V. label on disc D179.

References
Notes

Sources

Wood, Henry, My Life of Music (London, 1938)

External links
 "The March of Glory", by John Warren, 3rd Baron de Tabley
 Elgar Marches on CD
 Elgar Birthplace Museum
 
 
 Free sheet music of the marches on Cantorion.org

Compositions by Edward Elgar
British marches
Graduation
Music for orchestra and organ
Music dedicated to family or friends
1901 compositions
1904 compositions
1907 compositions
1930 compositions
Graduation songs
Concert band pieces